Jonathan Laurens Pérez (born August 2, 1977 in Caracas) is a retired Venezuelan football striker.

Club career
Laurens previously played for Raja Casablanca, joining from Carabobo FC.

References

1977 births
Living people
Footballers from Caracas
Venezuelan footballers
Association football midfielders
Carabobo F.C. players
Deportivo Italia players
Trujillanos FC players
Raja CA players
Al-Ittihad Aleppo players
A.C.C.D. Mineros de Guayana players
Aragua FC players
Venezuelan expatriate footballers
Expatriate footballers in Syria
Venezuelan expatriate sportspeople in Syria
Syrian Premier League players
21st-century Venezuelan people